Mehragan or Mehregan or Mehrgan, also rendered as Mehrakan, may refer to:
 Mehregan, Isfahan
 Mehregan, Kerman
 Mehregan, Kermanshah
 Mehragan-e Bala
 Mehragan-e Pain
 Mehregan Rural District, in Hormozgan Province